On October 6, 2021, al-Qaeda-allied jihadists from Jama'at Nasr al-Islam wal Muslimin (JNIM) ambushed a Malian convoy in Mopti Region, killing scores of Malian soldiers. The ensuing firefight left dozens of jihadists dead.

Ambush 
In the late morning of October 6, Malian vehicles passing through Bodio, a small village between Koro and Bandiagara, were ambushed by IEDs. Jihadists waiting nearby then engaged in a firefight with the stunned Malian soldiers. In the following days, the Malian army claimed to have responded "vigorously" with airstrikes and further operations in the area.

Later, the attack was claimed by Jama'at Nasr al-Islam wal Muslimin.

Losses and aftermath 
On the evening of the ambush, the Malian government announced a death toll of nine soldiers. However, local officials stated that sixteen soldiers were killed and ten were injured. Malian operations after the attack killed fifteen jihadists and captured twenty motorcycles, according to Malian government officials.

References 

Battles in 2021
Battles involving Mali
Battles involving the Islamic State of Iraq and the Levant
Mali War